Walpole is an English surname.

People
 Aaron Walpole (born 1979), Canadian actor
 Alice Walpole (born 1963), British ambassador
 Brian Walpole, Concorde pilot
 Doug Walpole (born 1942), Australian politician
 Edward Walpole (disambiguation), several people
 Frederick Walpole (1822–1876), British naval officer and politician
 Galfridus Walpole (1683–1726), British naval officer and politician
 Gary Walpole (born 1963), Australian rules footballer
 George Walpole (disambiguation)
 Henry Walpole (1558–1595), English Jesuit martyr and Roman Catholic saint
 Horace Walpole (1717–1797), writer
 Horatio Walpole (disambiguation), several people
 Hugh Walpole (1884–1941), novelist
 John Walpole (1797–1864), English soldier and diplomat
 Michael Walpole (1570–1614), English Jesuit and controversialist
 Ralph Walpole (died 1302), medieval Bishop of Norwich and Bishop of Ely
 Richard Walpole (1728–1798), British politician
 Robert Walpole (disambiguation), several people
 Spencer Horatio Walpole (1806–1898), British politician
 Spencer Walpole (1839–1907), English historian and civil servant
 Stanley Walpole (1886–1968), Australian actor
 Thomas Walpole (1727–1803), British politician and banker

See also
 Baron Walpole, a title in the Peerage of Great Britain
 Walpole family, a famous English aristocratic family
 Walpole (disambiguation)

Surnames of English origin